The Photo Injector Test Facility at the DESY location in Zeuthen (PITZ) was built in order to test and to optimize sources of high brightness electron beams for future free electron lasers (FELs) and linear colliders. The focus at PITZ is on the production of intense electron beams with very small transverse emittance and reasonably small longitudinal emittance which are required in order to meet the high-gain conditions of FEL operation. This challenge is met by applying the most advanced techniques in combination with key parameters of projects based on TESLA technology like FLASH and the XFEL.

PITZ Collaboration 
  (BESSY)
 Council for the Central Laboratory of the Research Councils (CCLRC), Daresbury Laboratory
  (DESY)
  (FZD)
 Humboldt Universität of Berlin
  (INFN)
 , INFN, Milano
 Institute for Nuclear Research (INR), Russian Academy of Sciences, at Troitsk, Moscow
 Institute for Nuclear Research and Nuclear Energy (INRNE), Sofia, Bulgaria
 Yerevan Physics Institute (YERPHI), Armenia
 , located at the Paris-Saclay University, Orsay
 Max Born Institut (MBI), Berlin
  Darmstadt University of Technology), 
 Universität Hamburg

External links 
 PITZ
PITZ — Official PITZ group website
 FELs
FLASH;
 European X-Ray Free Electron Laser;

Experimental particle physics